Swinfen is a small community about two miles south of Lichfield in the civil parish of Swinfen and Packington, Staffordshire.

Swinfen is referred to in the Domesday Book of 1086 when the Manor was held by the Bishop of Lichfield.

The present building known as Swinfen Hall Hotel was built as the Manor House in 1757.

Swinfen Hall Prison complete with staff accommodation, and a country craft centre, stands adjacent to the entrance to Swinfen Hall Hotel.

See also
Listed buildings in Swinfen and Packington

Villages in Staffordshire
Lichfield District